Cardioglossa nigromaculata is a species of frog in the family Arthroleptidae. It is found in the south-western Cameroon and in the extreme southern Nigeria at low altitudes. Common name blackspotted long-fingered frog has been coined for it.

Description
Males measure  and females, based on a single specimen,  in snout–vent length. Males have extremely long third fingers and spines in the fingers and in the groin; females lack these characteristics. Dorsal markings, typical for the genus Cardioglossa, consist of an hour-glass pattern, with a separate blotch on the head. The white line running under the tympanum terminates under the eye.

Habitat and conservation
Individuals can be spotted in small groups along forest watercourses, often in undergrowth among dead leaves and in holes. Breeding presumably takes place in streams where the tadpoles develop.

Cardioglossa nigromaculata is fairly common species, but it is often missing from seemingly suitable habitat. The overall population is believed to be decreasing because of habitat loss caused by urbanization, agriculture, and logging. It occurs in the Korup National Park in Nigeria and in the Ebo Forest Reserve in Cameroon.

References

nigromaculata
Frogs of Africa
Amphibians of West Africa
Amphibians of Cameroon
Fauna of Nigeria
Taxa named by Fritz Nieden
Amphibians described in 1908
Taxonomy articles created by Polbot